Jorge Villazán Guillén (born 5 October 1962) is a Uruguayan former footballer who played as a midfielder. He made five appearances for the Uruguay national team in 1983. He was also part of Uruguay's squad for the 1983 Copa América tournament.

References

External links
 

1962 births
Living people
People from Durazno
Uruguayan footballers
Association football midfielders
Uruguay international footballers
Club Nacional de Football players
Club Atlético River Plate footballers
Club de Gimnasia y Esgrima La Plata footballers
Montevideo Wanderers F.C. players
C.A. Progreso players
Club Alianza Lima footballers
Deportivo Maldonado players
Uruguayan expatriate footballers
Uruguayan expatriate sportspeople in Argentina
Expatriate footballers in Argentina
Uruguayan expatriate sportspeople in Peru
Expatriate footballers in Peru